Marina Chapman (born c. 1950) is a Colombian-born British woman known for her claim to have spent much of her early childhood in the jungle, alone except for a colony of capuchin monkeys.

Chapman states that when she was approximately five years old, she was taken from her village (whose name she was too young to have learned), and then released for a reason she did not understand; she spent the next several years following capuchin monkeys, until hunters rescued her—by which point she had no human language. According to Chapman, she later was sold to a brothel in Cúcuta, then lived on the streets, and then became a slave of a mafia family.

A neighbour, Maruja, rescued her from her predicament. Maruja's daughter, Maria, adopted Chapman when Chapman was approximately 14, and Maruja sent Chapman to Bogotá to live with one of her daughters. This family had connections to the city of Bradford, Yorkshire, England, through the textile industry. The family sent their children to Bradford in 1977 and sent Chapman to be a nanny. She had lived in Bradford since about 1983. 

She subsequently wrote her autobiography, "The Girl With No Name" (published 2013 by Mainstream Publishing), with the help of her daughter Vanessa; it was rejected by several publishers because they believed it was not authentic. She currently lives in Bradford and married a scientist from the Bradford area.
Chapman and her husband have two children.

National Geographic created the documentary Woman Raised By Monkeys. It premiered on Thursday 12 December 2013.

Analysis
Carlos Conde, a professor in Colombia, stated that he did a test using pictures of Chapman's adopted family and capuchin monkeys that strongly suggested that Chapman was telling the truth. A University of London psychology professor, Christopher French, argued that Chapman may be affected by false memories.

References

External links
Audio interview with Chapman, on Q
 
 
 

Living people
Feral children
People from Bradford
Colombian women writers
British women writers
1950 births